Clive Anthony Lewis (born 11 September 1971) is a British Labour politician who has been the Member of Parliament (MP) for Norwich South since winning the seat at the 2015 general election. Lewis was a candidate for Leader of the Labour Party in the 2020 leadership election. He is a member of the Socialist Campaign Group parliamentary caucus.

He previously served as vice-president of the National Union of Students, worked as a TV reporter for BBC News and served as an infantry officer with the Territorial Army. He served a three-month tour of duty in Afghanistan in 2009.

He became shadow defence secretary in June 2016, and shadow business secretary in October 2016. He left the Shadow Cabinet in 2017 in protest over the Labour Party's decision to whip its MPs into voting to trigger Article 50 but re-joined the front bench a year later as shadow minister for sustainable economics.

He stood in the 2020 Labour Party leadership election, but did not receive the required 22 parliamentarian nominations, and withdrew.

Early life and education
Clive Antony Lewis was born in London on 11 September 1971. He grew up on a council estate in Northampton, the son of a single father, and is of mixed race; his father is from Grenada and his mother from England. He was the first member of his family to attend university, studying economics at the University of Bradford before being elected student union president, and later vice-president of the National Union of Students (NUS). In November 1995, he was a signatory to a letter that argued for the abolition of student loans.

Lewis was suspended from the role of vice-president of the NUS in 1996 by its president, Jim Murphy, for publicly supporting concerns about tuition fees. Murphy's actions were condemned by Ken Livingstone, then a Labour MP. Lewis ran for president of the National Union of Students in 1996 on a platform of unfunded full grants and free education, and lost the election to Douglas Trainer.

Career
After completing a post-graduate diploma in journalism, he worked on local newspapers in Northampton and Milton Keynes, and was then accepted into the BBC's News Trainee Scheme. He went on to work as a broadcast journalist in Nottingham, Norwich, and Coventry. He then became the main reporter on the BBC's Politics Show East.

Lewis joined the Territorial Army, passing out of the Royal Military Academy Sandhurst in 2006 as an infantry officer with The Rifles. In 2009, he served a three-month tour of duty in Afghanistan. In an opinion piece he wrote years later, Lewis said "despite being on the left, and despite being told in the cadets that 'there ain't no black in the union jack', I still opted to serve".  Shortly after returning from his tour of duty, he experienced depression, saying "I just felt like I was being crushed by it all." He receiving counselling through the Ministry of Defence and recovered.

Political career

Parliamentary candidate 
Lewis was selected as the Labour Party's prospective parliamentary candidate for Norwich South at the party's hustings in November 2011, beating other candidates including the musician Dave Rowntree. Norwich South had been won by Simon Wright of the Liberal Democrats in the 2010 general election with a majority of just over 300 votes, defeating former Home Secretary and Education Secretary Charles Clarke.

In April 2015, during an interview by the New Statesman, in response to a question on whether he was taking his upcoming victory for granted, he said he would only lose if "he was caught with [his] pants down behind a goat with Ed Miliband at the other end". He subsequently apologised for the remark, saying he was "sincerely sorry" "if" anyone had been offended by the comment.

Lewis opposed the Labour Party's position on immigration. Locally, Lewis supported the campaign to prevent the Hewett School, a comprehensive school in Norwich, from being turned into an academy.

First term (2015–2017) 
On 7 May 2015, Lewis was elected MP for Norwich South with a 15.8% majority of 7,654. Lewis, in his victory speech, declared New Labour to be "dead and buried" and promised to stand up for Norwich's most vulnerable against an "onslaught of cuts" by the governing Conservative Party.

In June 2015, Lewis was elected Chair of the All Party Parliamentary Humanist Group. In the same month, he became a patron of the Anti-Academies Alliance.

Lewis was one of 36 Labour MPs to nominate Jeremy Corbyn as a candidate in the 2015 Labour leadership election. Corbyn credited Lewis with getting his nominations "off the ground". Lewis has been described as an ally of Corbyn, who was elected leader. In September 2015, he was appointed to the Labour frontbench as a shadow minister in the Energy and Climate Change team.

Following resignations from Corbyn's shadow cabinet after the 2016 EU referendum, Lewis was appointed as shadow defence secretary. In September 2016, at the Labour Party's 2016 Conference, when Lewis was preparing to give his first speech as shadow defence secretary, a section of his speech announcing that he "would not seek to change" Labour's current policy on nuclear weapons was changed by Corbyn's communications advisor Seumas Milne. Lewis was informed of the change by a sticky note. A month later, Corbyn removed Lewis from the defence brief, replacing him with Nia Griffith. Lewis was then appointed as shadow business secretary. The move was viewed as a tactical demotion.

On 8 February 2017, Lewis resigned from the shadow cabinet, citing the Labour Party's decision to whip its MPs to vote to trigger Article 50 to start Brexit negotiations.

In April 2017, Lewis was one of thirteen MPs to vote against triggering the 2017 general election. In the election he was re-elected with a majority of 30.4 per cent.

Second term (2017–2019) 
Clive Lewis was accused of groping a woman at Momentum's "World Transformed" event at the 2017 Labour party conference. In response, Lewis said he was "pretty taken aback" by the accusation and "completely" and "categorically" denied it. On 12 December 2017, he was cleared by Labour's National Executive Committee sexual harassment panel.

At the 2019 Labour party conference, Lewis published a paper which accused the party of a "moral failure" on migrants' rights and called for the party to adopt an open border immigration policy. He also accused party leader Jeremy Corbyn of being "silent on detention centres" and the "no recourse to public funds" policy of the Conservative government.

In January 2018, Lewis was reappointed to Labour's shadow frontbench as a shadow Treasury minister, responsible for sustainable economics.

2017 Labour Conference controversy
Video footage, taken at a fringe event at the 2017 Labour Conference, emerged in which Lewis told the actor Sam Swann to "get on your knees, bitch". Lewis' language attracted criticism from Labour colleague, but Swann later described the situation as "jovial". Stella Creasy, Labour colleague, said: "It's not OK. Even if it's meant as a joke, it reinforces menace that men have the physical power to force compliance." Swann told The Guardian: "It is clearly jovial and nothing vicious. Swann also said "The whole event was so brilliant for seeing MPs letting their hair down and fucking around with people who support them. I think Clive Lewis is an absolute legend." Lewis subsequently tweeted an apology, in which he described his behaviour as "offensive and unacceptable".

Third term (from 2019) 
In the 2019 general election, Lewis was returned with a reduced majority.

In December 2019, he announced that he would run in the 2020 Labour Party leadership election following Corbyn's resignation. Despite a petition by members and supporters to get him on the ballot due to his democratisation and electoral reform policies, he received only five of the necessary 22 nominations from Labour MPs, and withdrew from the contest, which allowed his five supporters to nominate other candidates before nominations closed on 13 January.

A few days before Liz Truss became prime minister in September 2022, Lewis said that the government had the power to address the United Kingdom cost of living crisis through measures such as: a windfall tax, nationalisation of energy companies, implementing retrofits of homes, and establishing a universal basic income and universal basic services. He said such things would not be implemented under Truss because, "it will not favour the private interests who are benefiting from the cost of living crisis, such as the funders of dark money think tanks that appear to be driving the incoming Truss government's agenda."

In September 2022, following the death of Queen Elizabeth II, Lewis wrote an article criticising the monarchy and the "flawed reality of the very limited democracy we inhabit". Lewis stated that he despaired at the queues to see Queen's coffin and noted that the royal succession "is as much about coercion as consent". He also criticised the language of "duty" and "sacrifice" used about the royal family which he said to be a lie and he called for constitutional, democratic reform. In the title of the article he referred to himself as a republican.

Personal life
Clive Lewis married Yorkshire school teacher and actress Katy Steel in May 2017. Their daughter Zana was born in 2018.

Bibliography

Notes

References

External links

|-

|-

|-

1971 births
Living people
Alumni of the University of Bradford
BBC newsreaders and journalists
Black British MPs
Black British politicians
British Army personnel of the War in Afghanistan (2001–2021)
British broadcaster-politicians
British republicans
British television journalists
Electoral reform in the United Kingdom
English humanists
English people of Grenadian descent
English socialists
Graduates of the Royal Military Academy Sandhurst
Labour Party (UK) MPs for English constituencies
People from Northampton
The Rifles officers
UK MPs 2015–2017
UK MPs 2017–2019
UK MPs 2019–present